Betina Riegelhuth (born 17 June 1987) is a Norwegian handball player who plays for the Norwegian club Storhamar HE. She previously played for Ski, Njård IL, Bækkelaget and Team Esbjerg. She made her debut on the national team in 2010. Her first appearance in an international championship for the national selection was in the 2014 European Women's Handball Championship.

She is a younger sister of Linn-Kristin Riegelhuth Koren.

Achievements
World Championship:
Winner: 2015
European Championship:
Winner: 2014
Norwegian League:
Silver: 2020/2021, 2021/2022
Bronze: 2009/2010, 2011/2012, 2017/2018
Norwegian Cup:
Finalist: 2018, 2019

References

1987 births
Living people
Norwegian female handball players
Handball players from Oslo
Norwegian expatriate sportspeople in Denmark
Expatriate handball players